The  (ENAP meaning National School of Public Administration) is a graduate school in Quebec City, Quebec, Canada. It was established in 1969 by the Quebec provincial government as a means of encouraging people to study professional public administration during a period when a number of social and structural changes were taking place within the province.  The enabling legislation is An Act respecting educational institutions at the university level.

The school is unique in that it is partly a pragmatic learning environment geared to educating Quebecers for positions within the public administration and partly a traditional university. ENAP has five campuses throughout Quebec, with two major campuses in Quebec City and Montreal, and three campuses in Gatineau, Saguenay, and Trois-Rivières.

Mission
The mission of ENAP is to contribute to the development of public administration both theoretically and in practice. Training, services to organizations, research, and services are offered in partnership. ENAP seeks to set the standard for public administration in Quebec.

Campus
 The Quebec City campus (head office) is 555, boulevard Charest Est Québec (Québec) G1K 9E5.
 The Montreal campus is 4750, avenue Henri-Julien, 5e étage Montréal (Québec) H2T 3E5.
 The Gatineau campus is 283, boulevard Alexandre-Taché Gatineau (Québec) J8X 3X7.
 The Saguenay campus is 637, boulevard Talbot Saguenay (Québec) G7H 6A4.
 The Trois-Rivières campus is 3351, boulevard des Forges Pavillon Ringuet, C.P. 500 Trois-Rivières (Québec) G9A 5H7.

Programs

ENAP offers a variety of programs:
Specialized Graduate Diplomas in Public administration, International administration and Regional administration.
Master of Public Administration for Analysts in International administration, Organizational analysis and development, Program evaluation and Human resource management.
 Master of Urban Management Analysis for Analysts
Master of Public Administration for Managers in Public management, International management and Municipal management
 PhD in Public policy analysis and management and Organizational theory and public management
 12 short 15 credit courses

See also
 Canada School of Public Service
 École nationale d'administration

References

External links

    (in French)

Université du Québec
Education in Montreal
Public administration schools
Education in Quebec City
1969 establishments in Quebec
Educational institutions established in 1969
Universities and colleges in Quebec